Water polo in the 2013 World Aquatics Championships was held between 21 July – 3 August at Piscines Bernat Picornell in Barcelona, Spain.

Medal summary

Medal table

Men

Women

References

External links
Official website
Records and statistics (reports by Omega)

 
2013 World Aquatics Championships
2013
2013
2013 World Aquatics Championships